Scientific study is a kind of study that involves scientific theory, scientific models, experiments and physical situations. It may refer to:

Scientific method, a body of techniques for investigating phenomena, based on empirical or measurable evidence that is subject to the principles of logic and reasoning
Observational study, draws inferences about the possible effect of a treatment on subjects, where the assignment of subjects into a treated group versus a control group is outside the control of the investigator
Randomized controlled trial, a type of scientific experiment, often in the medical field, where the people being studied are randomly allocated one of the different treatments 
Science, a systematic enterprise that builds and organizes knowledge in the form of testable explanations and predictions about the universe

See also
 Experiment
 Scientific modelling
 Scientific theory
 Reality

References